Prem Nagar is a locality in Dehradun City of Uttarakhand, India. With total population of 11830, It was named after Ral Bahadur Prem Nath. Following the creation of the Indian Military College in 1922 in the nearby village of Garhi, the Indian Military Academy was founded in 1932 in Prem Nagar on the grounds of the Railway Staff College.

It's the main bazaar for a number of local areas and towns.

Notes and references

Villages in Dehradun district